Aschbach is a river of Lower Franconia, Bavaria, Germany.

The source of the Aschbach is in the district of Bad Kissingen, south of the military training ground Hammelburg, near the Bildeiche. It starts southwards, along the street 2294 to Gauaschach, a district of Hammelburg. There it flows into the Main-Spessart district and changes its flow direction to the southwest. Via Obersfeld, Hundsbach, Bühler and Münster, it reaches Aschfeld (all are Gemarkungen of Eußenheim). Here it crosses the street Bundesstraße 27 and flows from the right into the Wern.

See also
List of rivers of Bavaria

References

Rivers of Bavaria
Rivers of Germany